The Timrå Church is a church building in Östrand in Timrå, Sweden. Belonging to the Timrå Parish of the Church of Sweden, it was inaugurated on 16 October 1796.

References

External links

18th-century Church of Sweden church buildings
Churches in Västernorrland County
Churches completed in 1796
Timrå
Churches in the Diocese of Härnösand
1796 establishments in Sweden